Science, Money, and Politics: Political Triumph and Ethical Erosion is a 2001 book by Daniel S. Greenberg.  The book explores science policy and politics over the past forty years, with particular reference to big science, university research shops, government labs, scientific societies, and funding agencies.

See also
List of books about the politics of science
Science In Society

References

2001 non-fiction books
Books about the politics of science